Jelgava Airfield  is an airfield in Latvia located on the north border of Jelgava, a city in Latvia. During Soviet times, it was a military forward deployment attack base, but now is used by general aviation.

Latest update on airfield condition: /10.04.2011: RWY surface is good, in some places small stones. Bushes at threshold RWY27. Can be used for takeoffs and landings.

Overview: Former soviet air force base. After soviet collapse used mainly by Rīgas Aeroklubs for parachute dropping and general aviation activities. The aerodrome was built with 2500m long runway, which was gradually shortened to 800m after the aerodrome was let to privatisation.

Status: Un-certified

Airfield condition: Average; runway and taxiways have sharp edges, some uneven plates on the RWY

Coordinates and location: 56.672962 N, 23.691684 E; North side of Jelgava town

Elevation: 6m / 20 ft

Runway direction: 09/27

Runway dimensions: 800x20m

Runway surface: concrete plates

Radio frequency: 123.95 MHz

Obstacles: NIL

Ownership: municipality

Fuel availability: NIL

To see: Jelgava town, the Rastrelli Palace

History

Jelgava airport construction began in 1937 and finished in 1938. It was originally planned as civil airport, however, after Soviet annexation of Latvia in 1940 it became a base for Soviet military aircraft, and continued so after WWII was over. Since 1945, the airfield was used by various Soviet air force units. Air Base Jelgava was part of the first defense line of the Soviet Union. While Air Base Tukums was one of the main Soviet Air Force bases in Latvia for aircraft like the Mig-29 and SU-27, air base Jelgava was a backup base with one runway. The air base was maintained for possible backup and used for helicopters and some light aircraft. In the 1980s the runway was extended to be 2500 meters long and 45 meters wide to allow use by jet aircraft.

The 285th OVE REB (Russian Отдельная вертолётная эскадрилья Радиоэлектронной борьбы, Independent Electronic Warfare Helicopter Squadron) flying modifications of Mi-8 aircraft was based here from 1979. In the late 1980s Riga DOSAAF relocated to the adjacent field from Spilve and used it for skydiving and gliding sport. Due to Latvian independence, in 1992 the helicopter squadron was relocated to Lyambir air base near Saransk, and later dissolved. The airfield was since then used by general aviation, mostly skydivers and small aircraft. The skydiving operation was shut down in 2010 due to death of the dropzone owner. The same year, a larger portion of runway concrete was removed, shortening it to just 800 meters, and narrowing to 20 meters. Most taxiways and aircraft parking spots were also removed.

As of 2018, the airfield takes up only a fraction of the former air base territory. Most of the territory is reclaimed by nature, and the majority of former military buildings are abandoned or collapsed. Some areas are also used for airsoft games and ATV riding.

As of 2023, the aerodrome is reported to be closed.

References

Jelgava
Latvian airbases
Soviet Air Force bases